Walter Bowers Pillsbury (July 21, 1872 – June 3, 1960) was an American psychologist, born at Burlington, Iowa. He studied for two years at Penn College, Oskaloosa, Iowa, graduated from the University of Nebraska (1892), and subsequently completed a Ph.D. at Cornell University (1896). Pillsbury taught at the University of Michigan after 1897, in 1905–1910 as junior professor of philosophy and director of the psychological laboratory and afterward as professor of psychology. In 1908–1909 he lectured at Columbia. He served as president of the Western Philosophical Association in 1907 and of the American Psychological Association in 1910. Besides contributing to the American Journal of Psychology and to The Philosophical Review, he translated, with Edward B. Titchener, Külpe's Introduction to Philosophy (1897) and published:
 L'Attention (1906; English edition, as Attention, 1908; Spanish translation, 1910)
 The Psychology of Reasoning (1910)
 The Essentials of Psychology (1911)
 A History of Psychology (1929)

Sources

External links
 
 

1872 births
1960 deaths
American science writers
Presidents of the American Psychological Association
People from Burlington, Iowa
William Penn University alumni
Cornell University alumni
University of Nebraska alumni
Columbia University faculty
University of Michigan faculty